A mobile robot is an automatic machine that is capable of locomotion. Mobile robotics is usually considered to be a subfield of robotics and information engineering.

Mobile robots have the capability to move around in their environment and are not fixed to one physical location.  Mobile robots can be "autonomous" (AMR - autonomous mobile robot) which means they are capable of navigating an uncontrolled environment without the need for physical or electro-mechanical guidance devices.  Alternatively, mobile robots can rely on guidance devices that allow them to travel a pre-defined navigation route in relatively controlled space.  By contrast, industrial robots are usually more-or-less stationary, consisting of a jointed arm (multi-linked manipulator) and gripper assembly (or end effector), attached to a fixed surface. The joint.

Mobile robots have become more commonplace in commercial and industrial settings.  Hospitals have been using autonomous mobile robots to move materials for many years.  Warehouses have installed mobile robotic systems to efficiently move materials from stocking shelves to order fulfillment zones. Mobile robots are also a major focus of current research and almost every major university has one or more labs that focus on mobile robot research. Mobile robots are also found in industrial, military and security settings.

The components of a mobile robot are a controller, sensors, actuators and power system. The controller is generally a microprocessor, embedded microcontroller or a personal computer (PC). The sensors used are dependent upon the requirements of the robot. The requirements could be dead reckoning, tactile and proximity sensing, triangulation ranging, collision avoidance, position location and other specific applications. Actuators usually refer to the motors that move the robot can be wheeled or legged. To power a mobile robot usually we use DC power supply (which is battery) instead of AC.

Classification 
Mobile robots may be classified by:

 The environment in which they travel:
 Land or home robots are usually referred to as Unmanned Ground Vehicles (UGVs). They are most commonly wheeled or tracked, but also include legged robots with two or more legs (humanoid, or resembling animals or insects).
 Delivery & Transportation robots can move materials and supplies through a work environment
 Aerial robots are usually referred to as Unmanned Aerial Vehicles (UAVs)
 Underwater robots are usually called autonomous underwater vehicles (AUVs)
Polar robots, designed to navigate icy, crevasse filled environments
 The device they use to move, mainly:
 Legged robot : human-like legs (i.e.  an android) or animal-like legs.
 Wheeled robot.
 Tracks.

Mobile robot navigation 

There are many types of mobile robot navigation:

Manual remote or tele-op 
A manually teleoperated robot is totally under control of a driver with a joystick or other control device. The device may be plugged directly into the robot, may be a wireless joystick, or may be an accessory to a wireless computer or other controller. A tele-op'd robot is typically used to keep the operator out of harm's way. Examples of manual remote robots include Robotics Design's ANATROLLER ARI-100 and ARI-50, Foster-Miller's Talon, iRobot's PackBot, and KumoTek's MK-705 Roosterbot.

Guarded tele-op 
A guarded tele-op robot has the ability to sense and avoid obstacles but will otherwise navigate as driven, like a robot under manual tele-op. Few if any mobile robots offer only guarded tele-op. (See Sliding Autonomy below.)

Line-following Car 
Some of the earliest Automated Guided Vehicles (AGVs) were line following mobile robots. They might follow a visual line painted or embedded in the floor or ceiling or an electrical wire in the floor. Most of these robots operated a simple "keep the line in the center sensor" algorithm. They could not circumnavigate obstacles; they just stopped and waited when something blocked their path. Many examples of such vehicles are still sold, by Transbotics, FMC, Egemin, HK Systems and many other companies. These types of robots are still widely popular in well known Robotic societies as a first step towards learning nooks and corners of robotics.

Autonomously randomized robot 
Autonomous robots with random motion basically bounce off walls, whether those walls are sensed.

Autonomously guided robot 

An autonomously guided robot knows at least some information about where it is and how to reach various goals and or waypoints along the way. "Localization" or knowledge of its current location, is calculated by one or more means, using sensors such motor encoders, vision, Stereopsis, lasers and global positioning systems. Positioning systems often use triangulation, relative position and/or Monte-Carlo/Markov localization to determine the location and orientation of the platform, from which it can plan a path to its next waypoint or goal. It can gather sensor readings that are time- and location-stamped. Such robots are often part of the wireless enterprise network, interfaced with other sensing and control systems in the building. For instance, the PatrolBot security robot responds to alarms, operates elevators and notifies the command center when an incident arises. Other autonomously guided robots include the SpeciMinder and the TUG delivery robots for the hospital.

Sliding autonomy 

More capable robots combine multiple levels of navigation under a system called sliding autonomy. Most autonomously guided robots, such as the HelpMate hospital robot, also offer a manual mode which allows the robot to be controlled by a person. The Motivity autonomous robot operating system, which is used in the ADAM, PatrolBot, SpeciMinder, MapperBot and a number of other robots, offers full sliding autonomy, from manual to guarded to autonomous modes.

History

See also 
 Ant robot
 Autonomous robot
 Autonomous Underwater Vehicle
 DARPA LAGR Program
 Domestic robot
 Humanoid robot
 Hexapod robot
 Industrial robot
 Justin (robot)
 Mobile industrial robots
 Mobile manipulator
 Mobile wireless sensor network
 Personal robot
 Robot
 Robot kit
 Robotic arm
 Robotic mapping
 Robot kinematics
 Rover (space exploration)
 Ubiquitous robot
 Unmanned Aerial Vehicle
 Wi-Fi

References

External links 
 Line Follower Robot Tutorial with Circuit Diagram
 A tutorial about line tracking sensors and algorithms
 BioRobotics Laboratory, Research in Mobile Robotics and Human-Robot Interaction 
 Department of Production at Aalborg University in Denmark, Research in Mobile Robotics and Manipulation
 The website for enthusiast of mobile robotics
 Mobile Robot MURVV

-